Whitesands, or East Tanna, is a language spoken on the eastern coast of Tanna Island in Vanuatu. It is closely related to the North Tanna and  Lenakel languages.

Phonology

Consonants

Vowels

References

Languages of Vanuatu
South Vanuatu languages